Alexandria "Allie" Trimm (born October 27, 1994) is an American singer and actress, active on Broadway, in regional theater and on television. She began performing in professional theatre in her native San Diego, California at age nine.

Trimm made her Broadway debut in Jason Robert Brown's 13, playing the role of Patrice from October 5, 2008, through its closing on January 4, 2009. She appeared in 13 earlier in 2008 at Goodspeed Musicals Norma Terris Theatre, Connecticut. She performed the role of Kim MacAfee in the Broadway revival of Bye Bye Birdie with John Stamos and Gina Gershon from September 2009 through closing on January 24, 2010.

Prior to the COVID-19 pandemic, Trimm was rehearsing the role of Little Mermaid in the upcoming Broadway musical Once Upon A One More Time featuring iconic music by Britney Spears. Trimm is currently pursuing a degree in psychology from Stanford University and coaching young performers around the world.

On December 14, 2021, Trimm joined the Broadway cast of Wicked, as the standby for the role of Glinda, making her Glinda debut on December 25, 2021.

Credits

Broadway
Wicked - Glinda Standby - Gershwin Theatre
13 - Patrice - Bernard B. Jacobs Theatre
Bye Bye Birdie - Kim McAfee - Henry Miller Theatre

Regional
 BAZ - Daisy Buchanon - The Palazzo Theatre
 Les Misérables - Éponine Thénardier - Lambs Players, San Diego (2014) 
 Allegiance - Hannah Campbell - Old Globe Theatre
 Brighton Beach Memoirs—Nora - Old Globe Theatre
 13- Patrice - Goodspeed Musicals
 The Secret Garden - Lamb's Players Theater, San Diego (2007) -- Mary
 Festival of Christmas - Lamb's Players Theater (2005) --Glory Thornberry
 How the Grinch Stole Christmas the Musical - Old Globe Theatre, San Diego (2006) -- Ensemble
 Annie Get Your Gun - Moonlight Stage, San Diego (2007)
 Will Rogers Follies - Moonlight Stage (2005) -- Mary Rogers

Film
 Prom
Saints Rest

Television
 30 Rock
 Private Practice

Recording
2008: 13, Original Broadway Cast Recording on Ghostlight Records

Readings

 Georgia Stitt's Water
 Penedo and Marshall Pailet's On a Glorious Day
 Jay Kuo and Lorenzo Thione's "Allegiance"

Other
Trimm sang The National Anthem and God Bless America for the Los Angeles Dodgers during the summer of 2009.

References

External links
 
 
 
 

1994 births
American stage actresses
Living people
American musical theatre actresses
American television actresses
Actresses from San Diego
21st-century American actresses